Cornelius Leo "Connie" Simmons (March 15, 1925 – April 15, 1989) was an American professional basketball player. He was born in Newark, New Jersey.

A 6'8" forward/center from Flushing High School in New York City, Simmons played ten seasons (1946–56) in the National Basketball Association as a member of the Boston Celtics, Baltimore Bullets, New York Knicks, Syracuse Nationals and Rochester Royals.  He averaged 9.8 points per game and 6.2 rebounds per game in his career and was a member of two league championship teams: the 1948 Bullets and the 1955 Nationals. He was the second player to enter the NBA without having played in college, after Tony Kappen.

Connie was the brother of professional basketball and baseball player Johnny Simmons.

BAA/NBA career statistics

Regular season

Playoffs

References

External links

1925 births
1989 deaths
Baltimore Bullets (1944–1954) players
Basketball players from Newark, New Jersey
Boston Celtics players
Centers (basketball)
New York Knicks players
Power forwards (basketball)
Rochester Royals players
Syracuse Nationals players
American men's basketball players